Lott is a city in Falls County, Texas, United States. As of the 2020 census, the city population was 644.

History
The Texas Townsite Company bought the land in 1889. When the San Antonio and Aransas Pass Railway was built through the area in 1890, Lott was founded; it was named in honor of Uriah Lott, president of the railroad. A post office was established at the settlement in 1890, with S. J. Crump as postmaster. When the community was incorporated by unanimous vote later that year, its population was estimated at more than 200. By 1892 Lott had Baptist, Methodist, and Presbyterian churches, two cotton gins and gristmills, a weekly newspaper, and 350 residents. Its population estimates were as high as 1,200 by the end of the 1890s. Lott continued to prosper throughout the first part of the 20th century when the town developed into a well-known speed trap, securing the town's primary revenue source to the present day. The First National Bank of Lott was established in 1903, and the Lott State Bank was chartered in 1909. Local businesses did well, and residents were optimistic about the community's future growth. Lott's economy received an additional boost in the 1920s when State Highway 44 (later U.S. 77) built through the community. The Great Depression, however, brought significant changes. In 1933, the First National Bank of Lott went into receivership and did not reopen. During the mid-1930s, many local families had to accept government relief to make ends meet, although the Public Works Administration and the Works Progress provided some residents with jobs on street and water works.

Cotton and corn were for many years the staple crops of area farmers, but government subsidies encouraged diversification into stock raising and truck farming. The population of the community was reported as 921 in the 1930s; it rose to 1,021 in the 1940s, but fell to 956 by the early 1950s. Lott lost its rail service in 1967, when the Southern Pacific abandoned the section of track between Waco and Rosebud. Population estimates for Lott fluctuated between 750 and 950 residents from the 1960s through the 1980s, and the number of businesses fell steadily, from 45 in the 1940s to 12 in the 1980s. Thirteen businesses and 828 residents were reported in Lott at the end of the 1980s. In 1990, its population was estimated at 775.

In June 2015, a TV station reported that the cities of Calvert, Franklin, Hearne, and Lott in a "Texas Triangle" were using their police departments to issue numerous speeding tickets to turn their municipal court into a "cash cow".

Geography

Lott is located southwest of the center of Falls County at  (31.2070, –97.0329), on high ground between the north-flowing Little Deer Creek and the south-flowing Cottonwood Creek, both tributaries of the Brazos River.

U.S. Route 77 passes through the city, leading north  to Waco and south  to Cameron. Texas State Highway 320 crosses US 77 at the west edge of downtown; it leads northeast  to Marlin and southwest  to Zabcikville.

Demographics

As of the 2020 United States census, there were 644 people, 243 households, and 139 families residing in the city.

As of the census of 2000, there were 724 people, 299 households, and 196 families residing in the city. The population density was 699.3 people per square mile (268.8/km). There were 343 housing units at an average density of 331.3 per square mile (127.3/km). The racial makeup of the city was 71.69% White, 20.99% African American, 0.14% Asian, 4.97% from other races, and 2.21% from two or more races. Hispanic or Latino of any race were 9.25% of the population.

There were 299 households, out of which 33.8% had children under the age of 18 living with them, 40.1% were married couples living together, 22.7% had a female householder with no husband present, and 34.4% were non-families. 31.8% of all households were made up of individuals, and 17.4% had someone living alone who was 65 years of age or older. The average household size was 2.42 and the average family size was 3.07.

In the city, the population was spread out, with 29.0% under the age of 18, 6.9% from 18 to 24, 24.6% from 25 to 44, 22.1% from 45 to 64, and 17.4% who were 65 years of age or older. The median age was 37 years. For every 100 females, there were 88.5 males. For every 100 females age 18 and over, there were 76.0 males.

The median income for a household in the city was $22,875, and the median income for a family was $27,500. Males had a median income of $25,556 versus $19,318 for females. The per capita income for the city was $10,650. About 27.1% of families and 27.1% of the population were below the poverty line, including 32.2% of those under age 18 and 25.0% of those age 65 or over.

Education
The City of Lott is served by the Rosebud-Lott Independent School District.

Photo gallery

References

External links

Cities in Texas
Cities in Falls County, Texas